Jeleniec may refer to the following places:
Jeleniec, Greater Poland Voivodeship (west-central Poland)
Jeleniec, Kuyavian-Pomeranian Voivodeship (north-central Poland)
Jeleniec, Lublin Voivodeship (east Poland)